This is a list of original downloadable games on the Wii video game console that could only be downloaded from the WiiWare section of the Wii Shop Channel. Translations of Japanese exclusive titles are highlighted between parenthesis.

All WiiWare titles can be transferred to and/or purchased via Wii Mode on the Wii U console. The last officially released WiiWare title was "Karaoke Joysound" on July 3, 2014.

Nintendo discontinued the Wii Shop Channel on January 31, 2019, nearly a year after the purchase of Wii Points ended on March 26, 2018.

Released Games 
There are  games included in the list.
{| class="wikitable sortable" width="auto" id="softwarelist"
|-
! Title and Source
! Developer(s)/Publisher(s)
! JP
! NA
! PAL
|-
| "Aha! I Found It!" Hidden Object GameAa! Mitsuketa! Item Sagashi GameJP
| Ateam Inc.
|  ||  || 
|-
| "Aha! I Got It!" Escape Game1 Nuke! Dasshutsu Game: My Home HenJP
| Ateam Inc.
|  ||  || 
|-
| 101-in-1 Explosive Megamix
| Nordcurrent
|  ||  || 
|-
| 2 Fast 4 Gnomz
| QubicGames
|  ||  || 
|-
| 3-2-1, Rattle Battle!Atsui 12 Game: Furi Furi Party!JP
| Tecmo
|  ||  || 
|-
| 3D Pixel Racing
| Microforum Ltd.
|  ||  || 
|-
| 3°C
| Kemco
|  ||  || 
|-
| 5 Arcade Gems
| Nordcurrent
|  ||  || 
|-
| 5 Spots Party
| Cosmonaut Games
|  ||  || 
|-
| 5-in-1 Solitaire
| Digital Leisure
|  ||  || 
|-
| 81diver (Hachi Wan Diver) Wii
| Silver Star Japan
|  ||  || 
|-
| A Monsteca Corral: Monsters vs. Robots
| Onteca
|  ||  || 
|-
| Adventure Island: The BeginningTakahashi Meijin no Bōken Jima WiiJP
| Hudson Soft
|  ||  || 
|-
| Adventure on Lost Island: Hidden Object GameItem Sagashi: Yōsei to Fushigi no ShimaJP
| Ateam Inc.
|  ||  || 
|-
| Aero Guitar
| Yudo
|  ||  || 
|-
| Airport Mania: First Flight
| Reflexive Entertainment, Lemon Games
|  ||  || 
|-
| Alien Crush Returns
| Hudson Soft, Tamsoft
|  ||  || 
|-
| And Yet It Moves
| Broken Rules
|  ||  || 
|-
| ANIMA: Ark of Sinners
| Anima Game Studio
|  ||  || 
|-
| Ant Nation
| Konami
|  ||  || 
|-
| AquaSpaceNAZenquaria: Virtual AquariumPALAqua Living: Terebi de Nagameru SakanatachiJP
| Nintendo, Paon
|  ||  || 
|-
| Arcade Essentials
| Nordcurrent
|  ||  || 
|-
| Arcade SportsArcade Sports: Air Hockey, Bowling, Pool, SnookerPAL
| Icon Games
|  ||  || 
|-
| Arkanoid Plus!
| Taito
|  ||  || 
|-
| Around the World
| Wizarbox
|  ||  || 
|-
| Art of Balance
| Shin'en Multimedia
|  ||  || 
|-
| Art Style: CUBELLOArt Style Series: CUBELEOJP
| Nintendo, skip Ltd.
|  ||  || 
|-
| Art Style: light traxArt Style Series: LightstreamJP
| Nintendo, skip Ltd.
|  ||  || 
|-
| Art Style: ORBIENTArt Style Series: ORBITALJP
| Nintendo, skip Ltd.
|  ||  || 
|-
| Art Style: ROTOHEXArt Style Series: DIALHEXJP
| Nintendo, skip Ltd.
|  ||  || 
|-
| Art Style: ROTOZOANAArt Style: PENTA TENTACLESPALArt Style Series: PENTA TENTACLESJP
| Nintendo, skip Ltd.
|  ||  || 
|-
| Astro Bugz Revenge
| Sudden Games
|  ||  || 
|-
| Aya and the Cubes of Light
| Object Vision Software
|  ||  || 
|-
| Babel Rising
| Lexis Numérique
|  ||  || 
|-
| Back to Nature
| UFA Lab
|  ||  || 
|-
| Bakutan (Bomb Tapper)
| Alpha Unit
|  ||  || 
|-
| Balloon Pop Festival
| UFO Interactive Games
|  ||  || 
|-
| Bang Attack
| Engine Software
|  ||  || 
|-
| Battle Poker
| Left Field Productions
|  ||  || 
|-
| Bejeweled 2
| PopCap Games
|  ||  || 
|-
| Ben 10 Alien Force: The Rise of Hex (no longer available in North America)
| Konami
|  ||  || 
|-
| Big Bass Arcade
| Big John Games
|  ||  || 
|-
| Big Kahuna Party
| Reflexive Entertainment
|  ||  || 
|-
| Bingo Party DeluxeWai Wai Bingo DeluxeJP
| Ateam Inc.
|  ||  || 
|-
| Bit Boy!!Bit Man!!JP
| Bplus, Marvelous Entertainment
|  ||  || 
|-
| bittos+
| Unconditional Studios
|  ||  || 
|-
| Blaster Master: Overdrive
| Sunsoft
|  ||  || 
|-
| Block Breaker Deluxe
| Gameloft
|  ||  || 
|-
| Blood Beach
| Coresoft Inc.
|  ||  || 
|-
| Bloons
| Hands-On Mobile
|  ||  || 
|-
| Bobby Carrot Forever
| FDG Entertainment
|  ||  || 
|-
| Boingz
| RealNetworks, NinjaBee
|  ||  || 
|-
| Boku wa Plarail Untenshi: Shinkansen & Jōkikikansha Hen
| Takara Tomy
|  ||  || 
|-
| Bokumo Sekai wo Sukuitai
| Poisoft
|  ||  || 
|-
| Bokumo Sekai wo Sukuitai: Battle Tournament
| Poisoft
|  ||  || 
|-
| Bomberman BlastWi-Fi 8 Hito Battle BombermanJP
| Hudson Soft
|  ||  || 
|-
| Bonsai Barber
| Zoonami, Nintendo
|  ||  || 
|-
| Brain Challenge (available from 2008-10-14 to 2011-06-28 in Japan)
| Gameloft
|  ||  || 
|-
| Brain Drain
| Enjoy Gaming
|  ||  || 
|-
| Bruiser and Scratch (no longer available in North America)
| Steel Penny Games
|  ||  || 
|-
| Bubble Bobble Plus!Bubble Bobble WiiJP
| Taito
|  ||  || 
|-
| BurgerTime World Tour (no longer available in North America)
| MonkeyPaw Games
|  ||  ||  
|-
| Burn the Rope
| Big Blue Bubble
|  ||  || 
|-
| Bust-a-Move Plus!NAPuzzle Bobble Plus!PALPuzzle Bobble WiiJP
| Taito
|  ||  || 
|-
| Carmen Sandiego Adventures in Math: The Big Ben Burglary
| Gamelion, The Learning Company
|  ||  || 
|-
| Carmen Sandiego Adventures in Math: The Case of the Crumbling Cathedral
| Gamelion, The Learning Company
|  ||  || 
|-
| Carmen Sandiego Adventures in Math: The Great Gateway Grab
| Gamelion, The Learning Company
|  ||  || 
|-
| Carmen Sandiego Adventures in Math: The Island of Diamonds
| Gamelion, The Learning Company
|  ||  || 
|-
| Carmen Sandiego Adventures in Math: The Lady Liberty Larceny
| Gamelion, The Learning Company
|  ||  || 
|-
| Carnival King
| Incredible Technologies, n-Space
|  ||  || 
|-
| Castlevania: The Adventure ReBirthDracula Densetsu ReBirthJP
| Konami, M2
|  ||  ||  
|-
| Cave Story
| Studio Pixel, Nicalis
|  ||  ||  
|-
| Chess Challenge!
| Digital Leisure
|  ||  || 
|-
| chick chick BOOMChicken Battle! chick chick BOOMJP
| tons of bits, Arc System Works
|  ||  || 
|-
| Chindōchō!! Pole no Daibōken(On a Weird Way!! Pole's Big Adventure)
| Sega
|  ||  || 
|-
| Christmas Clix
| JV Games
|  ||  || 
|-
| Chronos Twins DX
| EnjoyUP Games
|  ||  || 
|-
| Cocoto Fishing Master
| Neko Entertainment
|  ||  || 
|-
| Cocoto Platform Jumper
| Neko Entertainment
|  ||  || 
|-
| ColorZ
| Exkee, Luck Plus
|  ||  || 
|-
| Contra ReBirth
| Konami, M2
|  ||  || 
|-
| Copter Crisis
| Digital Leisure
|  ||  || 
|-
| Cricket Challenge
| Gameshastra
|  ||  || 
|-
| Critter Round-UpSaku Saku Animal PanicJP
| Epicenter Studios, Konami
|  ||  || 
|-
| Cruise Party
| Enjoy Gaming
|  ||  || 
|-
| Crystal Defenders R1
| Square Enix
|  ||  || 
|-
| Crystal Defenders R2
| Square Enix
|  ||  || 
|-
| Dart Rage
| JV Games
|  ||  || 
|-
| Darts Wii
| Alpha Unit
|  ||  || 
|-
| Deer CaptorShika GariJP
| Arc System Works
|  ||  || 
|-
| Defend Your Castle
| XGen Studios
|  ||  || 
|-
| Derby DogsDerby DogJP
| SIMS Co., Ltd., Aksys Games
|  ||  || 
|-
| Diatomic
| Grendel Games
|  ||  || 
|-
| Diner Dash (available from 2010-02-16 to 2011-03-31 in Japan, no longer available in all regions)
| Hudson Soft
|  ||  ||  
|-
| Discipline: Teikoku no Tanjou
| Marvelous Entertainment, Unigame Bunko
|  ||  ||  
|-
| Dive: The Medes Islands Secret
| Cosmonaut Games
|  ||  || 
|-
| Doc Clock: The Toasted Sandwich of Time
| Stickmen Studios
|  ||  || 
|-
| Doc Louis's Punch-Out!! (Club Nintendo reward in North America)
| Nintendo, Next Level Games
|  ||  || 
|-
| Downtown Nekketsu Dodgeball
| Miracle Kidz
|  ||  || 
|-
| Dr. Mario Online RxNADr. Mario & Germ BusterPAL Dr. Mario & Saikin BokumetsuJP
| Nintendo, Arika
|  ||  || 
|-
| Dracula: Undead Awakening
| Chillingo
|  ||  ||  
|-
| Dragon Master Spell Caster
| Stickmen Studios
|  ||  || 
|-
| Driift Mania
| Konami
|  ||  || 
|-
| Drill Sergeant MindstrongNABrain CadetsPALOnitore: Kyōkan wa OnigunsōJP (no longer available in Japan)
| HI Games & Publishing, Xseed Games, Rising Star Games
|  ||  || 
|-
| Drop Zone: Under Fire
| Selectsoft
|  ||  || 
|-
| Eat! Fat! FIGHT!Tsuppari Ōzumō Wii HeyaJP
| Tecmo
|  ||  || 
|-
| Eco Shooter: Plant 530NA530 Eco Shooter
| Nintendo, Intelligent Systems
|  ||  || 
|-
| Eduardo the Samurai Toaster
| Semnat Studios
|  ||  || 
|-
| Enjoy your massage!
| Microforum Ltd.
|  ||  || 
|-
| EquilibrioKatamuki SpiritsJP
| DK Games, Marvelous Entertainment
|  ||  || 
|-
| escapeVektor: Chapter 1
| Nnooo
|  ||  || 
|-
| Evasive Space (no longer available in North America)Kiken KūikiJP (no longer available in Japan)
| Yuke's, High Voltage Software, Tryfirst
|  ||  || 
|-
| Excitebike: World RallyNAExcitebike: World ChallengePALExcitebike: World RaceJP
| Nintendo
|  ||  || 
|-
| Family & Friends Party
| Gammick Entertainment
|  ||  || 
|-
| Family Card GamesOkiraku Daifugō Wii: Honkaku Wi-Fi Net TaisenJP
| Arc System Works
|  ||  || 
|-
| Family GamesFamily Games: Pen & Paper EditionPAL
| Icon Games
|  ||  || 
|-
| Family Glide HockeyOkiraku Air Hockey WiiJP
| Arc System Works
|  ||  || 
|-
| Family Go-Kart RacingOkiraku Kart WiiJP
| Arc System Works
|  ||  || 
|-
| Family Mini GolfOkiraku Putter Golf WiiJP
| Arc System Works
|  ||  || 
|-
| Family Pirate PartyOkiraku Sugoroku WiiJP
| Arc System Works
|  ||  || 
|-
| Family Slot Car RacingOkiraku Slot Car Racing WiiJP
| Arc System Works
|  ||  || 
|-
| Family Table TennisOkiraku Ping Pong WiiJP
| Arc System Works
|  ||  || 
|-
| Family TennisOkiraku Tennis WiiJP
| Arc System Works
|  ||  || 
|-
| Fantasic Cube
| Zoom Inc.
|  ||  ||  
|-
| Fantasic Tambourine
| Zoom Inc.
|  ||  || 
|-
| Fantasy Slots: Adventure Slots and Games
| Big John Games
|  ||  || 
|-
| FAST Racing League
| Shin'en Multimedia
|  ||  || 
|-
| Fast Draw Showdown
| Digital Leisure
|  ||  || 
|-
| Fenimore Fillmore "The Westerner"
| Revistronic
|  ||  || 
|-
| Final Fantasy Crystal Chronicles: My Life as a DarklordHikari to Yami no Himegimi to Sekai Seifuku no Tou: Final Fantasy Crystal ChroniclesJP
| Square Enix
|  ||  || 
|-
| Final Fantasy Crystal Chronicles: My Life as a KingChiisana Ōsama to Yakusoku no Kuni: Final Fantasy Crystal ChroniclesJP
| Square Enix
|  ||  || 
|-
| Final Fantasy IV: The After YearsFinal Fantasy IV: The After Years - Tsuki no KikanJP
| Square Enix, Matrix Software
|  ||  || 
|-
| FireplacingMy FireplacePAL
| Korner Entertainment
|  ||  || 
|-
| Fish Tank
| iFun4all
|  ||  || 
|-
| Fish'em All
| Abylight
|  ||  || 
|-
| Fishie Fishie
| DK Games
|  ||  || 
|-
| Flight Control
| Firemint
|  ||  || 
|-
| FlowerworksFlowerworks: Follie's AdventurePAL
| Nocturnal Entertainment
|  ||  || 
|-
| FluidityHydroventurePAL
| Nintendo, Curve Digital
|  ||  || 
|-
| Frobot
| Fugazo
|  ||  || 
|-
| Frogger Returns
| Konami
|  ||  || 
|-
| Frogger: Hyper Arcade Edition
| Konami
|  ||  || 
|-
| Full Blast HitchhikeLet's Zenryoku Hitchhike!!!!!!!!!JP
| Nippon Ichi Software
|  ||  || 
|-
| Fun! Fun! Minigolf
| Shin'en Multimedia
|  ||  || 
|-
| Furry Legends
| Gamelion Studios
|  ||  || 
|-
| F・O・R・T・U・N・E: Hoshi no Furi Sosogu Oka
| Cybird
|  ||  || 
|-
| Gabrielle's Ghostly Groove: Monster MixUshimitsu Monstruo: Fushigina Oshiro no Dance PartyJP
| Santa Entertainment, Natsume
|  ||  || 
|-
| Gene Labs
| Frontline Studios
|  ||  || 
|-
| Ghost Mania
| Legendo Entertainment
|  ||  || 
|-
| Ghost Mansion Party
| Gameloft
|  ||  || 
|-
| GhostSlayer
| Gevo Entertainment
|  ||  || 
|-
| Girlfriends Forever: Magic Skate
| Kolkom
|  ||  || 
|-
| Gnomz
| QubicGames
|  ||  || 
|-
| Gods vs. Humans (no longer available in Europe)
| Artefacts Studio, Zallag
|  ||  || 
|-
| Gradius ReBirth
| Konami, M2
|  ||  || 
|-
| Gravitronix
| Medaverse Studios
|  ||  || 
|-
| Grill-Off with Ultra Hand!NA (Club Nintendo reward in North America and Japan)Wii de Ultra HandJP
| Nintendo
|  ||  || 
|-
| Gyrostarr
| High Voltage Software
|  ||  || 
|-
| Hajīte! Block Rush
| Agenda
|  ||  || 
|-
| Hamekomi Lucky Puzzle Wii Returns (no longer available)
| Yuke's, Tryfirst
|  ||  || 
|-
| ''Happy HammerinTataite! MoguponJP
| Agenda, Gamebridge
|  ||  || 
|-
| Harvest Moon: My Little ShopBokujō Monogatari Series: Makiba no OmiseJP
| Marvelous Entertainment, Natsume
|  ||  || 
|-
| HB Arcade Cards
| HB Studios
|  ||  || 
|-
| HB Arcade Disc Golf
| HB Studios
|  ||  || 
|-
| Heavy Fire: Black Arms
| Teyon
|  ||  || 
|-
| Heavy Fire: Special Operations
| Teyon
|  ||  || 
|-
| Helix
| Ghostfire Games
|  ||  || 
|-
| Heracles Chariot Racing
| Neko Entertainment
|  ||  || 
|-
| Heron: Steam Machine
| Triangle Studios
|  ||  || 
|-
| High Voltage Hot Rod Show
| High Voltage Software
|  ||  || 
|-
| Hirameki Card Battle: Mekuruca
| Tom Create
|  ||  || 
|-
| Hockey Allstar Shootout
| Big Blue Bubble
|  ||  || 
|-
| Home Sweet Home
| Big Blue Bubble
|  ||  || 
|-
| HoopWorldHoopWorld: BasketBrawlPAL
| Streamline Studios, Virtual Toys
|  ||  || 
|-
| Horizon Riders
| Sabarasa
|  ||  || 
|-
| Hubert the Teddy Bear: Winter Games
| Teyon
|  ||  || 
|-
| Incoming!
| JV Games
|  ||  || 
|-
| Inkub
| Cosmonaut Games
|  ||  || 
|-
| Ivy the Kiwi? Mini
| Prope, Bandai Namco, Xseed Games
|  ||  || 
|-
| Jam City Rollergirls
| Frozen Codebase
|  ||  || 
|-
| Janken Party Paradise
| Studio Zan
|  ||  || 
|-
| JellyCar 2
| Disney Interactive Studios
|  ||  || 
|-
| Jett Rocket
| Shin'en Multimedia
|  ||  || 
|-
| Jewel Keepers: Easter Island
| Nordcurrent
|  ||  || 
|-
| Jinsei Game (The Game of Life) (no longer available)
| Takara Tomy
|  ||  || 
|-
| Jinsei Game: Happy Step (The Game of Life: Happy Step) (no longer available)
| Takara Tomy
|  ||  || 
|-
| Jintori Action! Taikōkenchi: Karakuri Shiro no Nazo
| Perpetuum
|  ||  || 
|-
| Jungle Speed (no longer available in North America)
| Playful Entertainment
|  ||  || 
|-
| Just JAM
| Big John Games
|  ||  || 
|-
| Kaku! Ugoku! Tsukamaeru! Sensei Wii
| Takara Tomy
|  ||  || 
|-
| Kanken: Minna de Wai Wai Kanji Nou
| IE Institute Co., Ltd.
|  ||  || 
|-
| Kappa-kun to Asobou: Kappa-kun no Ota no Shimikai
| Cable Entertainment
|  ||  || 
|-
| Kappa-kun to Asobou: Kappa-kun to 3 Biki no Koneko
| Cable Entertainment
|  ||  || 
|-
| Kappa-kun to Asobou: Kappa-kun to Mori no Nakamatachi (Play With Kappa: Kappa and Forest Friends)
| Cable Entertainment
|  ||  || 
|-
| Karaoke Joysound (WiiWare)Karaoke Joysound Wii (WiiWare Hen)JP
| Brother International Corp., Hudson Soft, Xing Inc.
|  ||  || 
|-
| Karate Phants: Gloves of Glory (available from 2009-07-10 to 2012-06-30)
| Snap Dragon
|  ||  || 
|-
| Kentei TV! Wii: Minna de Gotouchi Quiz Battle
| Kosaido Co. Ltd.
|  ||  || 
|-
| Kentōshi: Furi Furi Boxing
| Takara Tomy
|  ||  || 
|-
| Kodomo Kyōiku Terebi Wii: Aiue Ōchan
| Home Media
|  ||  || 
|-
| Kodomo Kyōiku Terebi Wii: Aiue Ōmuzu
| Home Media
|  ||  || 
|-
| Kotoba no Puzzle: Mojipittan Wii
| Bandai Namco
|  ||  || 
|-
| Kung Fu Funk: Everybody is Kung Fu Fighting!
| Stickmen Studios
|  ||  || 
|-
| Kyotokei
| Microforum Ltd.
|  ||  || 
|-
| La-Mulana
| Nigoro, Asterizm
|  ||  || 
|-
| Lead the Meerkats
| Lapland Studio
|  ||  || 
|-
| Learning with The PooYoos: Episode 1PooYoo to Asobou: Episode 1JP
| Lexis Numérique, Agatsuma Entertainment
|  ||  || 
|-
| Learning with The PooYoos: Episode 2
| Lexis Numérique
|  ||  ||  
|-
| Learning with The PooYoos: Episode 3
| Lexis Numérique
|  ||  || 
|-
| Let's Catch
| Sega, Prope
|  ||  || 
|-
| Licca-chan Oshare House
| Takara Tomy
|  ||  || 
|-
| Liight
| Studio Walljump
|  ||  || 
|-
| lilt line
| Gaijin Games
|  ||  || 
|-
| Line Attack Heroes
| Grezzo, Nintendo
|  ||  || 
|-
| LITSchool of DarknessJP
| WayForward Technologies, Square Enix
|  ||  || 
|-
| Little Tournament Over Yonder
| Gevo Entertainment
|  ||  || 
|-
| Lonpos (no longer available in all regions)
| Genki, Nintendo
|  ||  || 
|-
| LostWinds
| Frontier Developments, Square Enix
|  ||  || 
|-
| LostWinds 2: Winter of the Melodias
| Frontier Developments, Square Enix
|  ||  || 
|-
| Maboshi's ArcadeNAMaBoShi: The Three Shape ArcadePALKatachi no Game: Maru Bou ShikakuJP
| Nintendo, Mindware Corp
|  ||  || 
|-
| MadStone
| RiverMan Media
|  ||  || 
|-
| Magic DestinyNAMagic Destiny: Astrological GamesPAL
| Shanblue Interactive
|  ||  || 
|-
| Magnetica TwistNAActionloop TwistPALMinna de PuzzloopJP
| Nintendo, Mitchell Corporation
|  ||  || 
|-
| Magnetis
| Yullaby
|  ||  || 
|-
| Mahjong
| Cosmigo, GameOn
|  ||  || 
|-
| Major League Eating: The GameNAMajor League Eating
| Mastiff
|  ||  || 
|-
| Manic Monkey Mayhem (no longer available in all regions)
| Pinnacle Entertainment Ltd.
|  ||  || 
|-
| Mart Racer
| Joju Games
|  ||  || 
|-
| MDK2
| Interplay
|  ||  || 
|-
| Mega Man 9Rockman 9: Yabō no Fukkatsu!!JP
| Capcom, Inti Creates
|  ||  || 
|-
| Mega Man 10Rockman 10: Uchū kara no Kyōi!!JP
| Capcom, Inti Creates
|  ||  || 
|-
| Midnight BowlingHamaru BowlingJP
| Gameloft
|  ||  || 
|-
| Midnight PoolHamaru BilliardsJP
| Gameloft
|  ||  || 
|-
| miffy's world
| Biodroid, PAN Vision
|  ||  || 
|-
| Military Madness: NectarisNectarisJP (no longer available in all regions)
| Hudson Soft, Backbone Entertainment
|  ||  || 
|-
| Minna de Asobou: Koinu de Kururin(Play Together: Kururin as Puppies)
| MTO
|  ||  || 
|-
| Minna de Taisen Puzzle: Shanghai Wii
| Sunsoft
|  ||  || 
|-
| Minna de Tobikome! Penguin Diving: Hooper Looper
| Agenda
|  ||  || 
|-
| Mister Bumblebee Racing Champion
| h2f Informationssysteme
|  ||  || 
|-
| Mix Superstar
| Digital Leisure
|  ||  || 
|-
| Moki MokiAnata ga Mawashite Sukū Puzzle: Mochi Mochi QJP
| Natsume
|  ||  || 
|-
| Monochrome Racing
| Nordcurrent
|  ||  || 
|-
| MotoHeroz
| RedLynx
|  ||  || 
|-
| Mouse House
| Plaid World Studios
|  ||  || 
|-
| Mr. Driller WMr. Driller WorldJP
| Bandai Namco
|  ||  || 
|-
| Muscle MarchMuscle KōshinkyokuJP
| Bandai Namco
|  ||  || 
|-
| My AquariumBlue Oasis: Sakana no Iyashi KūkenJP
| Hudson Soft
|  ||  || 
|-
| My Aquarium 2Blue Oasis: Michinaru ShingaiJP
| Hudson Soft
|  ||  || 
|-
| My DolphinSea Farm: Iruka to Watashi no ShowtimeJP
| T&S Ltd.
|  ||  || 
|-
| My Little Baby
| dtp young entertainment
|  ||  || 
|-
| My PlanetariumNA(no longer available in North America)My Starry NightPALPlanetariumJP
| Hudson Soft
|  ||  || 
|-
| My Pokémon RanchMinna no Pokemon Bokujō: Platina TaiōbanJP
| Nintendo, Ambrella
|  ||  || 
|-
| My ZooAnimal Life: Dōbutsu Fureai SeikatsuJP
| Hudson Soft
|  ||  || 
|-
| Möbius Drive
| Jorudan Co. Ltd.
|  ||  || 
|-
| Neves PlusNA (no longer available in North America)Neves Plus: Pantheon of TangramsPAL (available from 2010-06-11 to 2012-06-30)Hamekomi Lucky Puzzle WiiJP (no longer available in Japan)
| Yuke's, Tryfirst, Abylight
|  ||  || 
|-
| Newton vs. The Horde
| RadiationBurn
|  ||  || 
|-
| Niki – Rock 'n' Ball
| Bplus
|  ||  || 
|-
| NyxQuest: Kindred Spirits
| Over The Top Games, Agatsuma Entertainment
|  ||  || 
|-
| Oekaki Logic (no longer available)
| G-Mode
|  ||  || 
|-
| OnslaughtMadsectaJP
| Hudson Soft, Shade
|  ||  || 
|-
| Order!!
| Poisoft
|  ||  || 
|-
| Othello
| Arc System Works
|  ||  || 
|-
| Ouchi de Mugen Puchi Puchi Wii
| Bandai Namco
|  ||  || 
|-
| Out of Galaxy: Gin no Kōshika (available from 2009-04-14 to 2011-11-29 in Japan)
| Sunsoft
|  ||  || 
|-
| Overflow
| Digital Leisure
|  ||  || 
|-
| OverturnOverturn: Mecha WarsPAL
| Studio Zan, Gamebridge
|  ||  || 
|-
| Paint Splash
| KnapNok Games
|  ||  || 
|-
| Pallurikio
| Playstos
|  ||  || 
|-
| Paper Wars: Cannon Fodder
| iFun4all
|  ||  || 
|-
| Party Fun PirateNAPop-up Pirate!PALKurohige Kiki Ippatsu WiiJP 
| Takara Tomy
|  ||  || 
|-
| Pearl Harbor Trilogy - 1941: Red Sun Rising
| Legendo Entertainment
|  ||  || 
|-
| Penguins & Friends: Hey! That's My Fish! (no longer available in North America, available from 2009-05-22 to 2012-05-15 in Europe)
| Gammick Entertainment
|  ||  || 
|-
| Phalanx
| Zoom Inc.
|  ||  || 
|-
| Phoenix Wright: Ace AttorneyGyakuten Saiban: Yomigaeru GyakutenJP
| Capcom
|  ||  || 
|-
| Phoenix Wright: Ace Attorney − Justice for AllGyakuten Saiban 2JP
| Capcom
|  ||  || 
|-
| Phoenix Wright: Ace Attorney − Trials and TribulationsGyakuten Saiban 3JP
| Capcom
|  ||  || 
|-
| PictureBook Games: Pop-Up PursuitNAPictureBook Games: A Pop-Up AdventurePALAsoberu Ehon Tobida Sugoroku!JP
| Nintendo
|  ||  || 
|-
| Pinocchio's Puzzle
| EnjoyUp Games
|  ||  || 
|-
| Pirates: The Key of Dreams
| Oxygen Games
|  ||  || 
|-
| Pit Crew Panic! (no longer available in North America, available from 2008-12-02 to 2012-03-30 in Japan)
| Hudson Soft
|  ||  || 
|-
| Planet Fish (no longer available in North America)
| Ludia
|  ||  || 
|-
| Planet Pachinko (no longer available in North America)
| Allied Kingdoms
|  ||  || 
|-
| Play with Birds
| Games Farm
|  ||  || 
|-
| Plättchen Twist 'n' Paint
| Bplus
|  ||  || 
|-
| Poker PuzzlePokers WiiJP (no longer available in Japan)
| Milestone, UFO Interactive Games
|  ||  || 
|-
| Pokosuka Racing
| Recom
|  ||  || 
|-
| Pokémon Fushigi no Dungeon: Ikuzo! Arashi no Bōkendan
| Nintendo, Chunsoft
|  ||  || 
|-
| Pokémon Fushigi no Dungeon: Mezase! Hikari no Bōkendan
| Nintendo, Chunsoft
|  ||  || 
|-
| Pokémon Fushigi no Dungeon: Susume! Honō no Bōkendan
| Nintendo, Chunsoft
|  ||  || 
|-
| Pokémon RumbleMelee! Pokemon ScrambleJP
| Nintendo, Ambrella
|  ||  || 
|-
| Pong Toss Pro - Frat Party Games
| JV Games
|  ||  || 
|-
| Pong Toss! Frat Party GamesNABeer Pong! Frat Party GamesPAL
| JV Games
|  ||  || 
|-
| Ponjan Wii
| Takara Tomy
|  ||  || 
|-
| Pool Revolution: Cue SportsNACue Sports: Snooker vs. BilliardsPALCue Sports: Wi-Fi Taisen BilliardsJP
| Hudson Soft
|  ||  || 
|-
| Pop 'Em, Drop 'Em SameGameNAPop Them, Drop Them SameGamePALSameGame WiiJP
| Hudson Soft
|  ||  || 
|-
| Pop (available from 2008-07-29 to 2011-09-27 in Japan)
| Nnooo, Electronic Arts
|  ||  || 
|-
| Popple to Mahou no Crayon(Popple and the Magical Crayon)
| G-Mode
|  ||  || 
|-
| PotpourriiPotpourrii: A delicate mixture of challenge and fun!PAL 
| Abstraction Games
|  ||  || 
|-
| Protöthea
| Digital Builders, Sabarasa, Ubisoft
|  ||  || 
|-
| Pub Darts
| Big Blue Bubble
|  ||  || 
|-
| Pucca's kisses game
| BigBen Interactive
|  ||  || 
|-
| Rabbids Lab
| Ubisoft
|  ||  || 
|-
| Racers' Islands: Crazy Arenas (no longer available in Europe)
| Artefacts Studio, Zallag
|  ||  || 
|-
| Racers' Islands: Crazy Racers (no longer available in Europe)
| Artefacts Studio, Zellag
|  ||  || 
|-
| Rage of the Gladiator
| Ghostfire Games
|  ||  || 
|-
| Rainbow Islands: Towering Adventure!
| Taito
|  ||  || 
|-
| Reel Fishing ChallengeFish Eyes ChallengeJP
| Marvelous Entertainment, Natsume
|  ||  || 
|-
| Reel Fishing Challenge II
| Marvelous Entertainment, Natsume
|  ||  || 
|-
| Reel Fishing Ocean Challenge
| Marvelous Entertainment, Natsume
|  ||  || 
|-
| Retro City Rampage
| Vblank Entertainment
|  ||  || 
|-
| Robin Hood: The Return of Richard
| Nordcurrent
|  ||  || 
|-
| Robocalypse: Beaver Defense
| Vogster Entertainment
|  ||  || 
|-
| Robox
| Dreambox Games
|  ||  || 
|-
| Rock N’ Roll Climber
| Vitei, Nintendo
|  ||  || 
|-
| Rubik's Puzzle Galaxy: RUSH
| Two Tribes
|  ||  || 
|-
| Rush Rush Rally Racing
| Senile Team
|  ||  || 
|-
| Saikyou Ginsei Gomoku Narabe
| Silver Star Japan, Electronic Arts
|  ||  || 
|-
| Saikyou Ginsei Igo
| Silver Star Japan, Electronic Arts
|  ||  || 
|-
| Saikyou Ginsei Mahjong
| Silver Star Japan, Electronic Arts
|  ||  || 
|-
| Saikyou Ginsei Shogi
| Silver Star Japan, Electronic Arts
|  ||  || 
|-
| Sandy BeachBeach de Oshiro wo Tsukutcha Wow!JP
| Konami
|  ||  || 
|-
| Save the Furries
| SDP Games
|  ||  || 
|-
| Sekai no Omoshiro Party Game
| SIMS Co., Ltd.
|  ||  || 
|-
| Sekai no Omoshiro Party Game 2
| SIMS Co., Ltd.
|  ||  || 
|-
| Sexy Poker
| Gameloft
|  ||  || 
|-
| ShadowPlay
| Deep Fried Entertainment
|  ||  || 
|-
| Shikakui Atama wo Maru Kusuru: Mainichi Minna no Challenge Hen
| Nichinoken, IE Institute Co., Ltd.
|  ||  || 
|-
| Shootanto: Evolutionary MayhemShootanto: Kako HenJP (available from 2008-12-09 to 2011-05-31 in Japan, no longer available in all regions)
| Grand Prix Games, Hudson Soft
|  ||  || 
|-
| Silver Star ChessSaikyou Ginsei ChessJP
| Silver Star Japan, Electronic Arts, Agetec
|  ||  || 
|-
| Silver Star ReversiSaikyou Ginsei ReversiJP
| Silver Star Japan, Electronic Arts, Agetec
|  ||  || 
|-
| Simple Series Vol. 1: The Block Kuzushi neo
| Tam Soft, D3 Publisher
|  ||  || 
|-
| Simple Series Vol. 2: The Number Puzzle neo
| Tam Soft, D3 Publisher
|  ||  || 
|-
| Simple Series Vol. 3: The Mahjong
| Tam Soft, D3 Publisher
|  ||  || 
|-
| Simple Series Vol. 4: The Misshitsu kara no Dasshutsu
| Intense, D3 Publisher
|  ||  || 
|-
| Simple Series Vol. 5: The Judo
| Tam Soft, D3 Publisher
|  ||  || 
|-
| Snail Mail
| Sandlot Games
|  ||  || 
|-
| Sneezies
| Chillingo
|  ||  || 
|-
| Snowboard RiotBoard WarriorsJP (available from 2009-02-10 to 2012-03-30 in Japan)
| Hudson Soft
|  ||  || 
|-
| Snowpack ParkPenguin SeikatsuJP
| Nintendo
|  ||  || 
|-
| Soccer Bashi
| Icon Games
|  ||  || 
|-
| Soccer Up!NAFootball Up!PAL
| EnjoyUp Games
|  ||  || 
|-
| Solitaire
| Cosmigo, GameOn
|  ||  || 
|-
| Sonic the Hedgehog 4: Episode I
| Sega
|  ||  || 
|-
| Sorcery Blade
| Kemco
|  ||  || 
|-
| Space Invaders Get Even
| Taito, Cattle Call
|  ||  || 
|-
| Space Trek
| Calaris
|  ||  || 
|-
| Spaceball Revolution
| Virtual Toys
|  ||  || 
|-
| SPOGS Racing
| D2C Games
|  ||  || 
|-
| Spot the Differences!
| Sanuk Games
|  ||  || 
|-
| Star Soldier R
| Hudson Soft
|  ||  || 
|-
| Step Up!
| GolemLabs & Zoozen
|  ||  || 
|-
| Stonekeep: Bones of the Ancestors
| Alpine Studios, Interplay
|  ||  || 
|-
| Stop Stress: A Day of Fury
| Abylight
|  ||  || 
|-
| Strong Bad's Cool Game for Attractive People - Episode 1: Homestar Ruiner
| Telltale Games
|  ||  || 
|-
| Strong Bad's Cool Game for Attractive People - Episode 2: Strong Badia the Free
| Telltale Games
|  ||  || 
|-
| Strong Bad's Cool Game for Attractive People - Episode 3: Baddest of the Bands
| Telltale Games
|  ||  || 
|-
| Strong Bad's Cool Game for Attractive People - Episode 4: Dangeresque 3: The Criminal Projective
| Telltale Games
|  ||  || 
|-
| Strong Bad's Cool Game for Attractive People - Episode 5: 8-Bit Is Enough
| Telltale Games
|  ||  || 
|-
| Stunt Cars
| Icon Games
|  ||  || 
|-
| Successfully Learning English: Year 2
| Tivola
|  ||  || 
|-
| Successfully Learning English: Year 3
| Tivola
|  ||  || 
|-
| Successfully Learning English: Year 4
| Tivola
|  ||  || 
|-
| Successfully Learning English: Year 5
| Tivola
|  ||  || 
|-
| Successfully Learning German: Year 2
| Tivola
|  ||  || 
|-
| Successfully Learning German: Year 3
| Tivola
|  ||  || 
|-
| Successfully Learning German: Year 4
| Tivola
|  ||  || 
|-
| Successfully Learning German: Year 5
| Tivola
|  ||  || 
|-
| Successfully Learning Mathematics: Year 2
| Tivola
|  ||  || 
|-
| Successfully Learning Mathematics: Year 3
| Tivola
|  ||  || 
|-
| Successfully Learning Mathematics: Year 4
| Tivola
|  ||  || 
|-
| Successfully Learning Mathematics: Year 5
| Tivola
|  ||  || 
|-
| Sudoku Challenge!
| Digital Leisure
|  ||  || 
|-
| Sugarbunnies Wii: Yōkoso Bunnies Field e (available from 2009-09-29 to 2012-05-22 in Japan)
| Takara Tomy
|  ||  || 
|-
| Sugu Suro Duo: New Pulsar R&V
| Yamasa Entertainment
|  ||  || 
|-
| Swords & Soldiers
| Ronimo Games
|  ||  || 
|-
| Tales of Elastic Boy: Mission 1
| Lexis Numérique
|  ||  || 
|-
| Tales of Monkey Island
| Telltale Games
|  ||  || 
|-
| Target Toss Pro: Bags
| Incredible Technologies, n-Space
|  ||  || 
|-
| Target Toss Pro: Lawn Darts
| Incredible Technologies, n-Space
|  ||  || 
|-
| Tenshi no Solitaire
| G-Mode
|  ||  || 
|-
| Tetris Party (no longer available in Japan)
| Hudson Soft
|  ||  || 
|-
| Texas Hold'em Poker
| Gameloft
|  ||  || 
|-
| Texas Hold'em Tournament
| Digital Leisure
|  ||  || 
|-
| The Amazing Brain Train!
| Grubby Games
|  ||  || 
|-
| The Fancy Pants Adventures
| Over the Top Games, Electronic Arts
|  ||  || 
|-
| The Incredible MazeChokkan! Balance LabyrinthJP (available from 2009-12-08 to 2012-05-22 in Japan)
| Digital Leisure, Gameloft
|  ||  || 
|-
| The Magic Obelisk (no longer available in North America)Shadow Walker: Kage no Shōnen to Hikari no YōseiJP
| Game Arts
|  ||  || 
|-
| The Mystery of Whiterock Castle
| RTL Playtainment
|  ||  || 
|-
| The Tales of Bearsworth Manor: Chaotic ConflictsKumanage Battle Hen: Kīna no Kiraina Aoi HōsekiJP
| Square Enix
|  ||  || 
|-
| The Tales of Bearsworth Manor: Puzzling PagesKumanage Puzzle Hen: Pīna no Sukina Akai CandyJP
| Square Enix
|  ||  || 
|-
| The Three Musketeers: One for all!
| Legendo Entertainment
|  ||  || 
|-
| The Very Hungry Caterpillar's ABCs (available from 2012-01-26 to 2012-11-30 in Europe, no longer available in all regions)Harapeko Aomushi no ABCJP
| Cybird
|  ||  || 
|-
| The Will of Dr. Frankenstein
| Enjoy Gaming
|  ||  || 
|-
| ThruSpaceNAThruSpace: High Velocity 3D PuzzlePALSurinuke AnatōsuJP
| Keys Factory, Nintendo
|  ||  || 
|-
| Tiki Towers
| RealNetworks
|  ||  || 
|-
| TNT Racers
| dtp Entertainment
|  ||  || 
|-
| Toki Tori
| Two Tribes
|  ||  || 
|-
| Tokyo City Nights
| Gameloft
|  ||  || 
|-
| Tomena SannerTomena Sanner WiiJP (no longer available in Japan)
| Konami
|  ||  || 
|-
| Tomy Car Drive Shutsudou! Kinkyū Sharyou Hen
| Takara Tomy
|  ||  || 
|-
| ToribashToribash: Violence PerfectedPAL
| Nabi Studios
|  ||  || 
|-
| Trenches Generals
| Fishing Cactus
|  ||  || 
|-
| Triple Jumping Sports (no longer available in North America)
| The Code Monkeys
|  ||  || 
|-
|Triple Running Sports (no longer available in North America)
| The Code Monkeys
|  ||  || 
|-
| Triple Shot Sports (no longer available in North America)
| The Code Monkeys
|  ||  || 
|-
| Triple Throwing Sports (no longer available in North America)
| The Code Monkeys
|  ||  || 
|-
| Tsūshin Taikyoku: Hayazashi Shogi Sandan
| Nintendo
|  ||  || 
|-
| Tsūshin Taikyoku: Igo Dōjō 2700-Mon
| Nintendo
|  ||  || 
|-
| Tumblebugs 2
| Wildfire Studios, Gameshastra
|  ||  || 
|-
| TV Show King
| Gameloft
|  ||  || 
|-
| TV Show King 2
| Gameloft
|  ||  || 
|-
| Ubongo
| Korner Entertainment
|  ||  || 
|-
| UNO
| Gameloft
|  ||  || 
|-
| Unou Kids: Okigaru Unou Training
| IE Institute Co., Ltd.
|  ||  || 
|-
| Urbanix
| Nordcurrent
|  ||  || 
|-
| V.I.P. Casino: Blackjack
| High Voltage Software
|  ||  || 
|-
| Vampire Crystals
| Shanblue Interactive
|  ||  || 
|-
| Violin Paradise
| Keystone Game Studio
|  ||  || 
|-
| Viral Survivalpeakvox escape virusJP
| Fun Unit, Nippon Ichi Software, Peakvox
|  ||  || 
|-
| Voodoo Dice
| Exkee, Ubisoft
|  ||  || 
|-
| WarioWare D.I.Y. ShowcaseNAWarioWare: Do It Yourself - ShowcasePALAsobu Made in OreJP
| Nintendo, Intelligent Systems
|  ||  || 
|-
| WarMen Tactics
| Calaris
|  ||  || 
|-
| Water WarfareBang Bang KidsJP
| Hudson Soft
|  ||  || 
|-
| Where's Wally? Fantastic Journey 1 (available from 2011-03-25 to 2012-12-31)
| Ludia
|  ||  || 
|-
| Where's Wally? Fantastic Journey 2 (available from 2011-04-15 to 2012-12-31)
| Ludia
|  ||  || 
|-
| Where's Wally? Fantastic Journey 3 (available from 2011-05-06 to 2012-12-31)
| Ludia
|  ||  || 
|-
| Wild West Guns
| Gameloft
|  ||  || 
|-
| Word Searcher
| Digital Leisure
|  ||  || 
|-
| Word Searcher Deluxe
| Digital Leisure
|  ||  || 
|-
| World of GooGoo no WakuseiJP
| 2D Boy, Nintendo
|  ||  || 
|-
| Xmas Puzzle
| EnjoyUp Games
|  ||  || 
|-
| Yakuman Wii: Ide Yosuke no Kenkou Mahjong
| Nintendo, Spice Games
|  ||  || 
|-
| Yard Sale Hidden Treasures: Sunnyville
| Konami
|  ||  || 
|-
| Yomi Kikase Asobi Wii
| Perpetuum
|  ||  || 
|-
| You, Me, and the CubesKimi to Boku to RittaiJP
| Nintendo, Fyto
|  ||  || 
|-
| Yummy Yummy Cooking Jam
| Virtual Toys
|  ||  || 
|-
| Zombie Panic in WonderlandZombie in WonderlandJP
| Akaoni Studio, Marvelous Entertainment
|  ||  || 
|-
| Zombii Attack
| Gamers Digital, Motiviti
|  ||  || 
|-
| Zoo Disc Golf
| Sonalysts
|  ||  || 
|-
|}

 Released Applications 
There are  applications included in the list.

 Released games on disc 
There are ''' games included in the list.

See also 

 Lists of Virtual Console games
 List of WiiWare games (North America)
 List of WiiWare games (PAL region)
 List of DSiWare games and applications
 List of Nintendo 3DS games
 List of Wii U software

Notes

References

External links 
 Nintendo of Japan's WiiWare page 
 Nintendo of America's WiiWare page 
 Nintendo of Europe's WiiWare page
 Hudson Soft's WiiWare portal 

WiiWare